Pierluigi Orlandini (born 9 October 1972) is an Italian former footballer who played as a midfielder.

Club career
Orlandini started his career with Atalanta in 1989, but was a fringe player and in 1992 was sold to Lecce, where he spent a season, before moving back to Atalanta. After another season long stay, he joined one of Italy's biggest clubs in 1994, Internazionale, where he spent 2 seasons, and subsequently moved to Verona in 1996. After this, he had unsuccessful spells with Parma and Venezia. In 2000, he played 2 games for A.C. Milan and scored 1 goal. He went on to spend the remainder of his career with Brescia, his former club Atalanta and Brindisi before retiring.

International career
At international level, Orlandini also won 10 caps for the Italian under-21 team between 1992 and 1994, scoring once. The goal was the Goalden Goal winner in the U-21 Euro Final against Portugal in the 1994-final.

References / external links
Career stats at footballplus.com

Living people
1972 births
Italian footballers
Italy youth international footballers
Italy under-21 international footballers
Association football midfielders
Serie A players
Serie B players
Serie C players
Atalanta B.C. players
U.S. Lecce players
Inter Milan players
Hellas Verona F.C. players
Parma Calcio 1913 players
Venezia F.C. players
A.C. Milan players
Brescia Calcio players
UEFA Cup winning players